Union General Hospital is a  hospital in the mountains of North Georgia, United States, and it is the public hospital for the city of Blairsville and Union County. Operated by the Union County Hospital Authority, it is located in the northeast section of the city.  It was named the 2016 Hospital of the Year by the HomeTown Health.

The facility recently added a new $30-million . expansion and has added a significant amount of top-of-the-line equipment. All of these changes add up to a $34 million expansion that turns Union General Hospital into a state-of-the-art medical facility.

References

External links
 Union General Hospital official homepage

Hospital buildings completed in 1959
Hospitals in Georgia (U.S. state)
Buildings and structures in Union County, Georgia
1959 establishments in Georgia (U.S. state)